Anton Roux (born 5 June 1981) is a former South African cricketer who is the current fielding coach of the Sri Lanka Men's National Cricket Team.

Early life 
Roux was born in New York City to South African parents. He moved back to South Africa aged five, playing both underage representative cricket and football, and later attended Pretoria Boys High School.

Playing career 
At South African domestic level, Roux played for Northerns. An off-spinner and competent lower-order batsman, he made his first-class and List-A debut during the 2007–08 season. He retired at the end of the following season to concentrate on his coaching career.

Coaching career 
In the 2005 and 2006 Dutch seasons, Roux served as playing coach of the Amstelveen-based Amsterdamsche Cricket Club (ACC), which plays in the top-level Topklasse competition. During his playing career in South Africa, he held a coaching position with the University of Pretoria's academy, and he later served as head coach of the Northerns Cricket Academy, following his retirement from playing.

KwaZulu-Natal Inland 
In July 2011, Roux was appointed head coach of the Pietermaritzburg-based KwaZulu-Natal Inland team for the 2011–12 season, which played in both the List-A and first-class provincial competitions.

Netherlands 
At the end of the 2011–12 season, Roux returned to the Netherlands to again coach ACC. Roux had been involved in the coaching set-up of the Dutch national team since 2011, and was later made a full-time assistant coach and statistical analyst. After Peter Drinnen vacated the head coach position in October 2013, Roux took over, initially on an interim basis. He coached the team at the 2014 World Twenty20 and the 2016 World Twenty20, amongst others.

Otago 
In August 2016, Roux took up a position as assistant coach of New Zealand provincial team, Otago, where fellow South African, Rob Walter, served as head coach. It was during this period that he was also called up as bowling coach to the New Zealand XI and assistant coach to New Zealand A.

Nottinghamshire 
Roux was named as pathway coach of English county, Nottinghamshire, in March 2020, working alongside head coach, Peter Moores.

Sri Lanka 
In March 2022, Roux was appointed fielding coach of the Sri Lankan Men's National Team.

References

1981 births
American cricket coaches
American cricketers
Coaches of the Netherlands national cricket team
Living people
Northerns cricketers
South African cricket coaches
South African cricketers
Cricketers from New York City
South African expatriates in the Netherlands
1
South African expatriates in New Zealand
[Category:Sri Lanka https://www.islandcricket.lk/news/featured/anton-roux-appointed-as-fielding-coach-of-sri-lanka/]